Al Baker (born 1956) is an American football player.

Al Baker may also refer to:

Al Baker (baseball) (1906–1982), American baseball player
Al Baker (magician) (1874–1951), American magician
Akbar Al Baker (born 1960), CEO of Qatar Airways

See also 
Alan Baker (disambiguation)
Albert Baker (disambiguation)
Alfred Baker (disambiguation)
Alexander Baker (disambiguation)
Baker (surname)